Dimitra Papadea (born 21 August 1991), known professionally as Demy, is a Greek singer. She is signed with the Greek independent label Panik Records. She has released two studio albums, "#1" in 2012, which became platinum and "Rodino Oniro" in 2014, which became gold. In 2017, she released "Demy", a collection of all of her English songs and later she released the album "Kontra" including two new songs and older songs and collaborations that had not been included in an album up to that time. Demy has achieved 8 No.1 songs and 2 No.1 EPs (Extended Plays) at the Greek charts so far. She also combined music and acting by having taken part in 5 musicals from 2012 to 2017.

Since the beginning of her career, Demy has been nominated 30 times for MAD Video Music Awards. Up to now, she has won 11 VMAs, including "Best New Artist" and "Best Female Artist" and she holds the record of the 4th most awarded artist in the history of the Greek VMAs. She has been awarded by the "MAD VMA Cyprus" (Annual Cyprus Awards) and by the "SuperFM Radio Cyprus". Also, she won at the MTV Europe Music Awards (EMA) at the category "Best Greek Act", among other Greek artists and has been chosen as the favourite Greek artist at the international Nickelodeon Kids' Choice Awards 2018.

In 2017, she represented Greece in the Eurovision Song Contest 2017, finished in 10th place at the first Semi-final and in 19th place at the Grand Final.

Biography
At the age of five, she started taking piano lessons, something she continues to do to this day. Also, she currently takes vocal lessons as well. Jazz, Soul, Rock and Roll, and RandB are cited as musical influences. Her first favorite song growing up was "I'm Like a Bird" by Nelly Furtado. Apart from singing professionally, she is also a law school student in Athens. She has stated that she still aspires to finish law school, and not devote herself to music exclusively, even though her popularity as a musician is increasing. Her father (Epaminondas Papadeas) and sister (Romy Papadea) are also attorneys in Papadeas Law firm.
Her mother Elena Boubouli is a Greek-American School owner of Masterlingua and Director of Studies for Epimorphosi Higher Education and Europe – Studies (medical studies abroad).

Career

2011–2012: Professional debut 
Demy first appeared in Midenistis' song, Mia Zografia which became a big hit in Greece and Cyprus. It received two awards from the MAD Video Music Awards 2012, the one for the best video clip Hip Hop/Urban and the other for the duet of the year. A new single, "Poses Hiliades Kalokeria" (How Many Thousand Summers) was released in June 2012
 and quickly reached No.1 on the iTunes Greece song chart. The song also reached No.1 on 7 July 2012 Billboard Greece Digital Songs chart, and remained in the top spot for 9 consecutive weeks, and 10 weeks in total. It also became a success on Greek radio, reaching No. 1 on the official Greek airplay chart.
 She also sings the lead vocals on Playmens' "Fallin". Some of her others songs are: "Pes Pos Me Thes," "Mia Zografia," "Mono Mprosta," and "Kratise Me." On 25 June 2012 she performed on the Greece, You Have Talent finale, singing a medley of her recent releases (Mia Zografia, Mono Mbrosta, and Poses Xiliades Kalokairia). On 6 July 2012, two new songs were released on YouTube: A "Poses Hiliades Kalokairia" dance remix, and "Love Light," an English language version of the "Poses Hiliades Kalokairia" dance remix. Both songs have also been released as digital singles. On 30 July 2012, the video for "Love Light" was released by Panik In the summer of 2012 she embarked on a tour that included performances in Greece, Cyprus and Russia. On 28 July 2012, Demy, along with Playmen, performed "Fallin" at the Europa Plus Live music festival in Moscow, Russia. The song has become popular in Russia, and has reached No. 1 on the Europa Plus Chart, the radio station of the organizers of the festival. On 21 September 2012, she made an appearance at the Amita Motion "Day of Positive Energy" music festival.  She performed with other members of her record label. On 22 October 2012, her new single, "I Zoi" (The Life), was released. A 24-second teaser was released on YouTube on 17 October 2012 In December 2012, it has been announced that she will be starring in the musical "Fame" at the "Ellinikou Kosmou" theater in Piraeus. It is also her desire to one day record songs that she herself has written. In winter 2012–2013 Demy appeared along Cypriot superstar Anna Vissi in Vissi's show LAV at Kentro Athinon, which was one of the most successful shows of the year.

Demy's first full-length studio album, No.1 was released in late 2012 according to her record label. She had confirmed via Twitter in September 2012 that she was in the studio working on the new album.  The album included ten tracks including two songs in English. The album also included her big hit in Greece with the Greek rap singer Midenistis "Mia Zografia".

2013–2014 
Demy performed "Believe" with Dima Bilan in the Greek final for Eurovision Song Contest 2013 in Greece. In May 2013 Demy released a summer song in English called "The Sun", along with producer Alex Leon and Greek rapper Epsilon, and became a big hit in Greece

In March 2014 an official video was launched by Playmen which features Demy for the song 'Nothing Better'. The song was directed by Yiannis Papadakos and was published by Panik Records. After that in May 2014 she released one more summer hit called "Oso O Kosmos Tha Exei Esena", along with the Greek rap singer Mike, and reached No.1 in Greece and Cyprus. It received one award from the MAD Video Music Awards 2015, for the duet of the year. On 22 December she released her second album, "Rodino Oneiro", which included 15 songs.

2015–2016
During the period of December 2014 to February 2015 Demy was performing in a night club, called "Fever", along with Despina Vandi and Nikos Oikonomopoulos. Also, that year was part of the Jury in a Talent Show, called "The Music School", which was displayed in the Greek channel,"Mega". During the summer of 2015 she had a lead role in one more Musical, "The Sound of Music", and the tickets during the tour were sold out!. In December 2015, it was announced that she will be performing in Casablanca Music Hall along with Nina Lotsari. Her performances there will be quite different from those she used to give since she will sing in funky and jazz rhythm instead of pop.

On 27 January 2016, the musical Aadam's Family was premiered at the Vempo Theatre and Demy embodied the role of Wednesday Addams along with well known actors such as Antonis Kafentzopoulos and Maria Solomou. Demy also appeared in Madwalk 2016 where she sang her new single "Tha meineis feugontas" and she walked on the catwalk for Tsakiris Mallas along with Doretta Papadimitriou. On 10 May 2016, Demy along with DiGi and the rock band RadioAct released the soundtrack of the first Greek action film "Short Fuse"

2017 (Eurovision Song Contest) 

On 13 January 2017, Demy was announced as the Greek representative in the Eurovision Song Contest 2017 held in Kyiv, Ukraine. Demy is going to collaborate with the "Dream Team" Dimitris Kontopoulos and Fokas Evangelinos. On 6 March 2017, it was selected that "This Is Love" will be the Greek song at Kyiv.In the Semi-final 1 on 9 May 2017, Greece and Demy qualified for the final, to be held on 13 May 2017. She finished in 19th place with 77 points, 48 from the juries and 29 from the televoting.

Discography

Studio albums

Collections

Extended plays

Singles

As lead artist

As featured artist

Promotional singles

List of awards and nominations received by Demy

MAD Video Music Awards Greece
The MAD Video Music Awards are presented annually by MAD TV (Greece), to recognize achievements in the Greek music industry, voted by the viewers of MAD TV. Demy has received 11 awards from 30 nominations.

|-
| style="text-align:center;" rowspan=6| 2012 ||rowspan=2| Demy || Best New Artist || 
|-
| Best Female Artist||  
|-
| style="text-align:left;" rowspan=3|Mia Zografia  || Video Clip Duet || 
|-
|| Video Clip Hip Hop/Urban ||  
|-
|| Video Clip of the Year ||  
|-
|Fallin 
|MAD Radio 106.2 Track of the Year || 
|-
| style="text-align:center;" rowspan=4| 2013 ||rowspan=2| Demy || Best Female Artist || 
|-
| Artist of the Year ||  
|-
| style="text-align:left;" rowspan=2|Poses Xiliades Kalokairia || Best Pop Video  ||  
|-
|| Video Clip of the Year ||  
|-
| style="text-align:center;" rowspan=6| 2014 ||rowspan=3| The Sun  || Video Clip Dance || 
|-
| Song of the Year ||  
|-
| Video Clip of the Year || 
|-
| style="text-align:left;" rowspan=1| Oloi Mazi (Me Mia Foni)  || Video Clip Duet / Collaboration || 
|-
| style="text-align:left;" rowspan=2| Demy || Best Female Artist || 
|-
| Artist of the Year || 
|-
| style="text-align:center;" rowspan=4| 2015 ||rowspan=3| Oso O kosmos Tha Exei Esena  || Best Duet || 
|-
| Best Video Clip Pop ||  
|-
| Best Video Clip ||  
|-
| style="text-align:left;" rowspan=1| Demy || Best Female Artist || 
|-
| rowspan=5| 2016
| rowspan=2| "I Alitheia Moiazei Psema"
| Best Video of the Year || 
|-
| Best Urban Video || 
|-
| "Where Is The Love"  (Demy feat. Angel Stoxx)
| Best Dance Video || 
|-
| rowspan=2| Demy
| Best Female Modern || 
|-
| Mad Cyprus Award || 
|-
| rowspan=5| 2017
| rowspan=2| "This Is Love"
| Video of the Year || 
|-
| Best Dance Video || 
|-
| "Tha Meineis Feugontas"  
| Best Ballad Video || 
|-
| rowspan=2| Demy
| Best Female Modern || 
|-
| Superfans of the Year || 
|-
| rowspan=1| 2019
| rowspan=1| Demy
|Best Female Modern || 
|-
| rowspan=1| 2021
| rowspan=1| Sta kokkina (feat. FY)
|MAD Radio 106.2 Track of the Year || 
|-
| rowspan=1| 2022
| rowspan=1| Apothimena  (feat. JiMbo)
|Best Pop Song ||
|-

 Mad Video Music Awards Cyprus

Super Fm Radio Cyprus

|-
| style="text-align:center;" rowspan=2| 2016 || style="text-align:left;" rowspan=2| Demy || Style Icon of The Year || 
|-
| Best Female Singer || 
|-
| rowspan=3 | 2017
| Demy
| Best Pop/Rock Singer
| 
|-
| "This Is Love"
| Best English Single
| 
|-
| "Me Oplo Tin Foni Sou" ft Demy
| Best Duet/Collaboration 
|  
|-
| rowspan=2  | 2018 
| "To Mono Pou Thimamai" Evridiki ft Demy
| Best Duet/Collaboration
| 
|}

MTV Europe Music Awards
The MTV Europe Music Awards (EMA) were established in 1994 by MTV Networks Europe to celebrate the most popular music videos in Europe. 

|-
| style="text-align:center;" rowspan=2| 2013 || style="text-align:left;" rowspan=2|  Demy || Best Greek Act || 
|-
| Best European Act || 
|-

Nickelodeon Kids' Choice Awards

|-
| style="text-align:center;" rowspan=2| 2018 || style="text-align:left;" rowspan=2|  Demy || Favorite Greek Music Artist || 
|-

Lalore02 Awards

|-
| style="text-align:center;" rowspan=1| 2012 || style="text-align:left;" rowspan=1| Poses Xiliades Kalokairia (Demy) || Song of the Year || 
|-

Musicals

Television

References

External links
 Demy Official Twitter Account
 Demy Official Fan Facebook Page

21st-century Greek women singers
Panik Records artists
Eastern Orthodox Christians from Greece
English-language singers from Greece
Eurovision Song Contest entrants for Greece
Eurovision Song Contest entrants of 2017
Greek dance musicians
Greek pop singers
Greek rock singers
Greek singer-songwriters
MAD Video Music Awards winners
1991 births
Living people
Greek people of American descent
MTV Europe Music Award winners
Singers from Athens